Thendral Varum Theru is a 1994 Indian Tamil-language romance film directed by N. G. Gowri Manohar and written by Mu. Metha. The film stars Ramesh Aravind and Kasthuri. It was released on 15 September 1994.

Plot

Cast 
Ramesh Aravind
Kasthuri
Keerthana
Rizabawa
Charuhasan
Chinni Jayanth
Charle
Bonda Mani
T. S. Raghavendra
Omakuchi Narasimhan

Production 
Thendral Varum Theru is the directorial debut for N. G. Gowri Manohar, and Mu. Metha's first film as screenwriter.

Soundtrack 
Soundtrack was composed by Ilaiyaraaja and lyrics for all songs were written by Mu. Metha.

Reception 
The Indian Express praised Mu. Metha's writing and Ramesh Aravind's performance "consistent".

References

External links 
 

1990s romance films
1990s Tamil-language films
1994 directorial debut films
1994 films
Films scored by Ilaiyaraaja
Indian romance films